The Dude Bandit is a 1933 American Pre-Code Western film directed by George Melford. Starring Hoot Gibson, the film is a remake of Gibson's Clearing the Range (1931).

Cast
Hoot Gibson as "Ace" Cooper posing as Tex
Gloria Shea as Betty Mason
Hooper Atchley as Al Burton
Skeeter Bill Robbins as "Skeeter"
Horace B. Carpenter as "Doc" Pettit
Neal Hart as Henchman Jack Hargan
Lafe McKee as Rancher Brown
Gordon De Main as Dan "Dad" Mason
Fred Burns as Sheriff Jim

External links 

1933 films
1933 Western (genre) films
1930s English-language films
American black-and-white films
American Western (genre) films
Films directed by George Melford
Remakes of American films
1930s American films